Aishath Sajina (born 2 January 1997) is a Maldivian swimmer. She competed in the women's 100 metre breaststroke at the 2020 Summer Olympics.

References

External links
 

1997 births
Living people
Maldivian female swimmers
Olympic swimmers of the Maldives
Swimmers at the 2020 Summer Olympics
Place of birth missing (living people)
Swimmers at the 2014 Summer Youth Olympics
Swimmers at the 2014 Asian Games
Swimmers at the 2018 Asian Games